Global Greengrants Fund is a charitable foundation that makes small grants (typically $500 to $5,000) to grassroots environmental causes around the world.  These funds are used to support community-based groups outside the United States and Western Europe working on issues of environmental justice, sustainability, and conservation.  Since its establishment in 1993, Global Greengrants Fund has made over 14,000 grants in 168 countries, giving a total of over $100 million.

Focus areas
Global Greengrants work is captured by six action areas: 1) climate justice, 2) local livelihoods, 3) healthy ecosystems and communities, 4) women's environmental action, 5) right to land, water, and resources, and 6) right to defend the environment.

Recognition
To date, 65 Greengrants grantees and advisors have been awarded the Goldman Environmental Prize, considered the "Nobel Prize of environmental activism".

See also

 Conservation movement
 Environmental protection
 Natural capital

References

External links
 Official website
Charity Navigator - Global Greengrants Fund

Conservation and environmental foundations in the United States